Maritimo is an Australian builder of motor yachts. The company's hand-built yachts include the M-Series Flybridge, the S-Series Sedan, and the X-Series Sport Yacht.

The company was established by Bill Barry-Cotter.

See also

List of companies of Australia

References

External links

Shipbuilding companies of Australia
Yacht building companies
Manufacturing companies based on the Gold Coast, Queensland
Australian brands
Luxury brands